Gary Brennan is an Irish Gaelic footballer who played for the Clondegad club and at senior level for the Clare county team. He also plays club hurling for Ballyea.

Playing career

Club

Inter-county
On 31 July 2016, Brennan started in midfield as Clare were defeated by Kerry in the 2016 All-Ireland Quarter-finals at Croke Park. His performances throughout 2016 earned him an All-Star award nomination.

In January 2021, Brennan announced his retirement from inter-county football.

International
Brennan was included in the squad for the 2015 and 2017 International Rules Series. He scored 1-0-1 in the second test of the 2017 Series, including a first half goal.

Other work
Brennan teaches P.E.E. and Irish at St Flannan's College in Ennis. He studied P.E.E. at the University of Limerick. Through his love of the Irish language he has accepted invitations to appear on TG4 Beo and Seó Spóirt.

Honours
Ballyea
 Munster Senior Club Hurling Championship (1) : 2016
 Clare Senior Hurling Championship (2) : 2016, 2018

Clare
 McGrath Cup: (1) : 2019 (c)
 National Football League Division 3: (1) : 2016 (c)

Ireland
 International Rules Series: (1): 2015

References

Year of birth missing (living people)
Living people
Alumni of the University of Limerick
Clare inter-county Gaelic footballers
Dual players
Irish international rules football players
Irish schoolteachers
Language teachers
TG4 people